There are many different numbering schemes for assigning nominal numbers to entities. These generally require an agreed set of rules, or a central coordinator. The schemes can be considered to be examples of a primary key of a database management system table, whose table definitions require a database design.

In computability theory, the simplest numbering scheme is the assignment of natural numbers to a set of objects such as functions, rational numbers, graphs, or words in some formal language. A numbering can be used to transfer the idea of computability and related concepts, which are originally defined on the natural numbers using computable functions, to these different types of objects.

A simple extension is to assign cardinal numbers to physical objects according to the choice of some base of reference and of measurement units for counting or measuring these objects within a given precision.  In such case, numbering is a kind of classification, i.e. assigning a numeric property to each object of the set to subdivide this set into related subsets forming a partition of the initial set, possibly infinite and not enumeratable using a single natural number for each class of the partition.

In some cases (such as computing, time-telling, and in some countries the numbering of floors in buildings) zero-based numbering is used, where the first entity is assigned "zero" instead of "one".

Other numbering schemes are listed by field below.

Chemistry
CAS registry numbers for chemical compounds
EC numbers for identifying enzymes
UN numbers for (classes of) hazardous substances 
E numbers for food additives

Communications
The E.164 numbering plan for telephone numbers, including:
Country calling codes
North American Numbering Plan
Numbering plans by country
Argentina: Argentine telephone numbering plan
Australia: Australian telephone numbering plan
China: China telephone numbering plan
France: French telephone numbering plan
Hong Kong: Hong Kong telephone numbering plan
India: India telephone numbering plan
Japan: Japanese telephone numbering plan
Singapore: Singapore telephone numbering plan
United Kingdom: UK telephone numbering plan
Germany: German telephone numbering plan
The IP address allocation scheme (IANA)
The DNIC prefixes of X.25 NUAs (Network User Address) assigned by the ITU
Object identifiers (OID)

Products

 The GS1 numbering scheme, including
 GTIN for products, which includes the UPC and EAN-13 barcodes
 ISBN codes for books
 ISSN codes for periodicals
Vehicle identification number
Stock keeping unit (SKU)

People

Identification numbers

National identification numbers
Personal Numeric Code (Romania) 
Personal identification number (Denmark)
Social Security number (United States)
Social insurance number (Canada)
INSEE number (France)
National Insurance number (United Kingdom)
Aadhaar (India)
Personal Public Service Number (Republic of Ireland)
Tax file number (Australia)
Unique Master Citizen Number (former Yugoslavia)
Det Centrale Personregister (Denmark)

Ordinals for names 
Regnal numbers
Princes of Reuss
Popes' ordinals
 Generational ordinal suffix to names

Topics
 Dewey Decimal Classification and Universal Decimal Classification for books
 West American Digest System legal topic numbering scheme

Geography and transport 

Postal codes
ZIP codes
 Geocodes (used also as fine-grained postal codes):
 Geohash
 Open Location Code
Global Location Numbers by GS1
FIPS place codes
House numbering schemes
Floor numbering
Room number
Line number
 See also: Country code; Address (geography).

Vehicles
 Vehicle registration plates
 British Carriage and Wagon Numbering and Classification
 British Rail locomotive and multiple unit numbering and classification
 UIC classification of goods wagons

Roads

Road numbering schemes
Arlington County, Virginia, street-naming system
China road numbering
Great Britain road numbering scheme
European route by UNECE
Numbered highways in the United States
Edmonton, Alberta#Street layout
Montreal
Highways in Australia#Route numbering systems

Others/general
API well numbers for numbering oil and gas wells in the United States
Bank card number
International Bank Account Number
International Geo Sample Number (IGSN)
International Statistical Classification of Diseases and Related Health Problems for diseases
The MAC address allocation scheme for hardware addresses of certain networking products
National Animal Identification System
National Pokédex
The NSAP allocation scheme
Post office box
Production code number
Stamp numbering system
Wikipedia markup syntax for numbered lists

See also
 naming scheme
 Digital Object Identifier
 Pagination
 Stephanus pagination for works of Plato
 Bekker numbers for the works of Aristotle
 Persistent identifier
 Unique identifier
 UUID

References